Kim Jin-ok (born 15 September 1990) is a North Korean diver. She competed in the 10 metre platform event at the 2008, 2012 Summer Olympics and 2010 Asian Games. She won bronze with partner Choe Un-gyong in the 3 m synchronized springboard event at the 2014 Asian Games.

References

North Korean female divers
Divers at the 2012 Summer Olympics
Divers at the 2008 Summer Olympics
Olympic divers of North Korea
1990 births
Living people
Asian Games medalists in diving
Divers at the 2010 Asian Games
Divers at the 2014 Asian Games
Asian Games bronze medalists for North Korea
Medalists at the 2014 Asian Games
21st-century North Korean women